Charles James Proby M.A. (23 January 1771 – 2 February 1859) was a Canon of Windsor from 1814 to 1859.

Family
He was the son of the Very Revd. Baptist Proby and Mary Russell.

He married Frances Sharrer, daughter of Revd. John Sharrer on 30 June 1814. They had the following children:
Gertrude Mary Proby 
Frances Susan Proby
Agnes Mary Proby
Charles John Proby
Churchill Proby

Career
He was educated at St John's College, Cambridge where he graduated B.A. in 1792, and M.A. in 1795.

He was appointed:

Vicar of Bishop’s Tachbrook, Warwickshire 1803
Chaplain to John Proby, 2nd Earl of Carysfort when ambassador to Berlin 
Vicar of St Mary's Church, Twickenham 1818 - 1859

He was appointed to the fifth stall in St George's Chapel, Windsor Castle in 1814 and held this until he died in 1859.

Notes 

1859 deaths
Canons of Windsor
Alumni of St John's College, Cambridge
1771 births